Jakub Šašinka (born 2 October 1995) is a Czech footballer who plays for Silon Táborsko. His younger brother Ondřej is also a football player.

Career

FC Baník Ostrava
Šašinka made his professional debut for FC Baník Ostrava against Mladá Boleslav on 13 September 2014.

References

External links
 FC Baník Ostrava official club profile
 Eurofotbal profile
 

1995 births
Living people
Czech footballers
Czech expatriate footballers
Czech Republic youth international footballers
Association football forwards
FC Baník Ostrava players
FK Poprad players
MFK Karviná players
1. FK Příbram players
FK Blansko players
AEP Kozani F.C. players
Al Dhaid SC players
FC Silon Táborsko players
Czech First League players
Czech National Football League players
2. Liga (Slovakia) players
UAE First Division League players
Expatriate footballers in Slovakia
Expatriate footballers in Greece
Expatriate footballers in the United Arab Emirates
Czech expatriate sportspeople in Slovakia
Czech expatriate sportspeople in Greece
Czech expatriate sportspeople in the United Arab Emirates